Solgohachia   is an unincorporated community in Conway County, Arkansas, United States, about 10 miles (16 km) north of Morrilton on Arkansas Highway 9 and Arkansas Highway 287.  The ZIP Code for Solgohachia is 72156.  The name is from the  Choctaw word Sok-ko-huch-cha, meaning "muscadine river".

Even though it is an unincorporated community, Shannon Oakley was appointed "Mayor" of Solgohachia.

Nearby Solgohachia Bridge was listed on the National Register of Historic Places on May 26, 2004. Unfortunately the old steel span bridge no longer exists. The creek it spanned is East Fork Point Remove Creek.

Education
It is in the South Conway County School District. It operates Morrilton High School.

References

Further reading

Unincorporated communities in Conway County, Arkansas
Unincorporated communities in Arkansas
Arkansas placenames of Native American origin